El Museo Universal (1857–1869) was a Spanish-language illustrated magazine produced by Gaspar y Roig in Madrid, Spain. It was a traditionalist magazine. In 1869 the magazine was absorbed into La Ilustración Española y Americana.

See also 
 Biblioteca ilustrada de Gaspar y Roig

References

External links

  + also here (fulltext)

1857 establishments in Spain
1869 disestablishments in Spain
Defunct magazines published in Spain
Magazines established in 1857
Magazines disestablished in 1869
Magazines published in Madrid
Spanish-language magazines